Sing Yin Secondary School, founded in 1970, is a Catholic, boys' grammar school and Band 1A secondary school in Hong Kong. It is a famous boys’ school in Kwun Tong district with over 50 years of the history since its establishment. The campus is around 70,000 sq. ft. The School Was Dubbed "The Greenest School on Earth" By U.S. Green Building Council in 2013.

Overview 
Sing Yin Secondary School was organized by Fr. H.P. Canavan, the priest of The Divine Word Missionaries. Later, he became the principal and the supervisor of the school for more than 20 years. Under his leadership, Sing Yin Secondary School quickly developed into a quality school to provide students with a good and comprehensive education.

As a Catholic school, Sing Yin Secondary School follows the teachings from Jesus, especially putting the focus on moral education and community service. The school's goal is to help students to establish a set of values that are meaningful, and become the true pillars of society.

Facilities

Old Lam Tin Campus 

Sing Yin Secondary School Old Lam Tin Campus is located at 11 On Tin Street, Lam Tin.

New Choi Wan Campus 

Sing Yin moved to the new campus at 38 New Clear Water Bay Road, Choi Hung. It is the first environmental demonstration school in Hong Kong.

The new campus includes different kinds of new facilities comparing with the old campus, such as:

 Motion Sensors in every classrooms
 Electricity regeneration Lift
 Solar tracking Photovoltic (PV) panels
 Water chiller plants
 Vertical wind turbine
 Sun tubes
 Solar powered water sprinklers

Clubs

Religious Clubs 

 Catholic Society
 Christian Fellowship

Academic Clubs 

 BAFS Club
 Biology Club
 Chemistry Club
 Chinese Club
 Chinese Debating Club
 Chinese History Club
 Computer Club
 Economics Club
 English Club
 English Debating Club
 Geography Club
 History Club
 Integrated Science Club
 Liberal Studies Club
 Mathematics Club
 Physics Club
 Putonghua Club
 Sports Clubs

Athletic Club 

 Badminton Club
 Basketball Club
 Canoeing Club
 Fencing Club
 Football Club
 Handball Club
 Health and Fitness Club
 Shuttlecock Club
 Sports Climbing Club
 Swimming Club
 Table Tennis Club
 Tennis Club

Interest Clubs 

 Astronomy Club
 Board Games and Chess Club
 Bridge Club
 Cookery Club
 Design and Technology Club
 Environmental Protection Club
 Gardening Club
 Hong Kong Award for Young People
 Journalism Club (stop operating since Sep 2022)
 Mock Trial Club
 Orienteering Club
 Quiz Team

Art Clubs 

 Dance Club
 Drama Club
 Photography Club
 Visual Arts Club

Music Clubs 

 Brass Band
 Choir
 Classical Guitar Club
 Music Club
 String Band

Social / School Services 

 Students' Association
 Red House
 Yellow House
 Blue House
 Green House
 Sing Yin Pioneers
 Careers Club
 Community Service Group
 Community Youth Club
 Scout
 Sing Yin Bulletin
 Sing Yin Radio
 Sing Yin Television
 Sports Commission
 Stage Management Club

See also
Society of the Divine Word

References

External links

School Website

Secondary schools in Hong Kong
Boys' schools in Hong Kong
Catholic secondary schools in Hong Kong